Roman Spitko (born 18 November 1978) is a German badminton player.

Career 
Spitko played the 2006 IBF World Championships in men's singles, defeating Carlos Longo of Spain in the first round. In the round of 32, he was defeated by Dicky Palyama of the Netherlands. He also played in men's doubles with Michael Fuchs, and they were defeated in the round of 16 by Luluk Hadiyanto and Alvent Yulianto of Indonesia.

Achievements

IBF Grand Prix 
The World Badminton Grand Prix was sanctioned by the International Badminton Federation from 1983 to 2006.

Men's doubles

BWF International Challenge/Series/European Circuit 
Men's singles

Men's doubles

Mixed doubles

  BWF International Challenge tournament
  BWF International Series / European Circuit tournament

External links 
 Roman Spitko's homepage
 BWF Player Profile

1978 births
Living people
People from Augsburg (district)
Sportspeople from Swabia (Bavaria)
German male badminton players